Terry W. Virts (born December 1, 1967) is a retired NASA astronaut, International Space Station Commander and colonel in the United States Air Force.

Background and education 
Virts was born in Baltimore, Maryland, but considers Columbia, Maryland, to be his hometown. He graduated from Oakland Mills High School in Columbia, Maryland in 1985.  He earned a Bachelor of Science degree in mathematics (with a French minor) from the United States Air Force Academy in 1989 and a master of aeronautical science degree in aeronautics from Embry-Riddle Aeronautical University in 1997.  While at the Air Force Academy, Virts attended the École de l'Air in 1988 on an exchange program.

Military career 
Virts was commissioned as a Second Lieutenant upon graduation from the United States Air Force Academy in 1989 and earned his pilot wings at Williams Air Force Base, Arizona. He completed basic fighter lead-in training at Holloman Air Force Base, New Mexico followed by formal training in the F-16 Fighting Falcon with the 56th Tactical Fighter Wing at MacDill Air Force Base, Florida.  He was then assigned to the 31st Tactical Fighter Wing at Homestead Air Force Base, Florida. After Hurricane Andrew struck southern Florida in 1992, his squadron was moved to Moody Air Force Base, Georgia. He was later assigned to the 36th Fighter Squadron at Osan Air Base, Republic of Korea, and the 22nd Fighter Squadron at Spangdahlem Air Base, Germany. Virts was selected for Test Pilot School in 1997 at Edwards Air Force Base, California. Following graduation, he was an Experimental Test Pilot at the F-16 Combined Test Force.  He has logged more than 5,300 flight hours in 40 different aircraft.

NASA career 

Virts was selected as a Space Shuttle pilot by NASA in 2000. His technical assignments included lead astronaut for the NASA T-38 program, Shuttle Avionics Integration Laboratory (SAIL) test crewmember, Expedition 9 crew support astronaut, CAPCOM, and lead astronaut for SLS.

On February 8, 2010, Virts launched on his first spaceflight as the pilot of STS-130 aboard Space Shuttle Endeavour, carrying the Tranquility module as well as the Cupola on the final assembly flight of the International Space Station. Endeavour landed on February 22, 2010.

On November 23, 2014, Soyuz TMA-15M carrying Virts, Samantha Cristoforetti and Anton Shkaplerov launched from the Baikonur Cosmodrome, Kazakhstan. It successfully docked at the International Space Station roughly six hours later.

On February 28, 2015, following the death of Star Trek actor Leonard Nimoy, who played Spock, Virts tweeted an image from the International Space Station of his Vulcan salute,  improvised by the actor when he was asked to portray an alien life form's desire that others live long and prosper, as the ISS flew over Boston, the city of the actor's birth.

With the impending scheduled departure of Soyuz TMA-14M in March 2015, Virts assumed command of the International Space Station as commander of Expedition 43.

Soyuz TMA-15M landed on June 11, 2015, in Kazakhstan.

Virts retired from NASA in August 2016.

Post-NASA career 

Virts tours the world as a public speaker and business consultant. He is an author, filmmaker and screenwriter who is developing literary and screen projects. In 2019, Terry Virts, part of a crew of eight aviation explorers, successfully accomplished the fastest circumnavigation of Earth via both geographic poles by aeroplane on July 11, 2019, in a world record time of 46hrs, 40mins, 22sec. The record was recognised by Guinness World Records and the Fédération Aéronautique Internationale FAI.

On December 11, 2020, Virts appeared on The Joe Rogan Experience

Awards and honors 
Virts graduated with Academic Distinction from the United States Air Force Academy and Embry-Riddle Aeronautical University, was a distinguished graduate of Undergraduate Pilot Training at Williams Air Force Base, Arizona, and F-16 training at MacDill Air Force Base, Florida. His military decorations include the Meritorious Service Medal, the Air Medal, Aerial Achievement Medal, and the Air Force Commendation Medal.

Publications 
 – A coffee table book from National Geographic; contains mostly photographs of Earth, with additional photos of the Space Shuttle Endeavour, the International Space Station and related subjects; also contains stories about Virts' experiences as an astronaut.
 – A limited edition, luxury replication of the Apollo 11 Flight Plan.
 – An Insiders Guide To Leaving Planet Earth.

See also 
A Beautiful Planet – 2016 IMAX documentary film showing scenes of Earth which features Virts and other ISS astronauts.
One More Orbit – A mission and documentary film. In 2019, Virts circumnavigated the planet in a Gulfstream G650 via the North and South Poles in honor of the Apollo 11 mission's 50th anniversary. The mission broke the world time and speed records, earning Guinness World and FAI records.

References

External links 
 
 Spacefacts biography of Terry W. Virts, Jr.
 Howard County Times: "Oakland Mills grad set for space launch" 

1967 births
Living people
Embry–Riddle Aeronautical University alumni
United States Air Force Academy alumni
United States Air Force officers
U.S. Air Force Test Pilot School alumni
American test pilots
Recipients of the Air Medal
United States Air Force astronauts
Commanders of the International Space Station
Space Shuttle program astronauts
Spacewalkers